List of United States Air Force air base squadrons including name, emblem location and notes.

See also

List of United States Air Force squadrons

[

Air Base